Mount Ronne is a prominent, flattish mountain which projects from the middle of the east side of the Haines Mountains, in the Ford Ranges of Marie Byrd Land. The mountain was probably first observed on aerial flights by the Byrd Antarctic Expedition (1928–30). Named by Advisory Committee on Antarctic Names (US-ACAN) for Martin Rønne, who was a sail maker, ski instructor, dog-driver, and ice pilot with the Byrd Antarctic Expedition, and who had been a shipboard member of the Fram on Amundsen's South Pole expedition (1910–12).
 

Mountains of Marie Byrd Land